Wutaishan Sports Center is a sports center in Nanjing, China. It was established in 1952 and it was one of the oldest and most advanced stadiums in early time of People's Republic of China.
It is home to the Wutaishan Stadium.

See also
Wutaishan Gymnasium

References

Sports venues in Nanjing